List of rivers flowing in the province of Maluku, Indonesia:

In alphabetical order

By Island

Ambon
 Sikula

Buru
Waeapo

Seram
Eti
Kawa
Masiwang
Sapalewa
Salawai
Tala

See also 
 List of rivers of Indonesia

References